An inexact differential or imperfect differential is a differential whose integral is path dependent. It is most often used in thermodynamics to express changes in path dependent quantities such as heat and work, but is defined more generally within mathematics as a type of differential form. In contrast, an integral of an exact differential is always path independent since the integral acts to invert the differential operator. Consequently, a quantity with an inexact differential cannot be expressed as a function of only the variables within the differential. I.e., its value cannot be inferred just by looking at the initial and final states of a given system. Inexact differentials are primarily used in calculations involving heat and work because they are path functions, not state functions.

Definition 
An inexact differential  is a differential for which the integral over some two paths with the same end points is different. Specifically, there exist integrable paths  such that ,  and

More generally, an inexact differential  is a differential form which is not an exact differential, i.e., for all functions ,

The fundamental theorem of calculus for line integrals requires path independence in order to express the values of a given vector field in terms of the partial derivatives of another function that is the multivariate analogue of the antiderivative. This is because there can be no unique representation of an antiderivative for inexact differentials since their variation is inconsistent along different paths. This stipulation of path independence is a necessary addendum to the fundamental theorem of calculus because in one-dimensional calculus there is only one path in between two points defined by a function.

Notation

Thermodynamics 

Statistical Mechanics 
Within statistical mechanics, inexact differentials are often denoted with a bar through the differential operator, đ. In LaTeX the command "\rlap{\textrm{d}}{\bar{\phantom{w}}}" is an approximation or simply "\dj" for a dyet character, which needs the T1 encoding.

Mathematics 

Examples

Total distance
When you walk from a point  to a point  along a line  (without changing directions) your net displacement and total distance covered are both equal to the length of said line . This example captures the essential idea behind the inexact differential in one dimension.

The path taken is  where there exists a time  such that  is strictly increasing before  and strictly decreasing afterward. Then  is positive before  and negative afterward, yielding the integrals,

exactly the results we expected from the verbal argument before.

First law of thermodynamics 

Inexact differentials show up explicitly in the first law of thermodynamics,

Based on the constants of the thermodynamic system, we are able to parameterize the average energy in several different ways. E.g., in the first stage of the Carnot cycle (which is isentropic) a gas is heated by a reservoir, giving us an isothermal expansion of that gas. During this stage, the volume is constant while some differential amount of heat  enters the gas. During the second stage, the gas is allowed to freely expand, outputting some differential amount of work . The third stage is similar to the first stage, except the heat is lost by contact with a cold reservoir, while the fourth cycle is like the second except work is done onto the system by the surroundings to compress the gas. Because the overall changes in heat and work are different over different parts of the cycle, there is a nonzero net change in the heat and work, indicating that the differentials  and  must be inexact differentials.

Since we can go from state  to state  either by providing heat  or work , such a change of state does not uniquely identify the amount of work  done to the system or heat  transferred, but only the change in internal energy .

Heat and work
A fire requires heat, fuel, and an oxidizing agent. The energy required to overcome the activation energy barrier for combustion is transferred as heat into the system, resulting in changes to the system's internal energy. In a process, the energy input to start a fire may comprise both work and heat, such as when one rubs tinder (work) and experiences friction (heat) to start a fire. The ensuing combustion is highly exothermic, which releases heat. The overall change in internal energy does not reveal the mode of energy transfer and quantifies only the net work and heat. The difference between initial and final states of the system's internal energy does not account for the extent of the energy interactions transpired. Therefore, internal energy is a state function (i.e. exact differential), while heat and work are path functions (i.e. inexact differentials) because integration must account for the path taken.

Integrating factors 
It is sometimes possible to convert an inexact differential into an exact one by means of an integrating factor.
The most common example of this in thermodynamics is the definition of entropy:

However, when divided by the absolute temperature and when the exchange occurs at reversible conditions (therefore the rev subscript), it produces an exact differential: the entropy  is also a state function.

Example 
Consider the inexact differential form,  This must be inexact by considering going to the point . Integrating over  first contributes  and then integrating over  contributes . Thus, along the first path we get a value of 2. And so  is an exact differential.

See also
Closed and exact differential forms for a higher-level treatment
Differential (mathematics)
Exact differential
Exact differential equation
Integrating factor for solving non-exact differential equations by making them exact
Conservative vector field

References

External links
Inexact Differential – from Wolfram MathWorld
Exact and Inexact Differentials – University of Arizona
Exact and Inexact Differentials – University of Texas
Exact Differential – from Wolfram MathWorld

Thermodynamics
Multivariable calculus